The Parish of the Holy Child of Peace (Spanish: Parroquia del Santo Niño de la Paz) is a historic church located near Paseo de la Reforma and Zona Rosa in Cuauhtémoc, Mexico City, Mexico. It is also known as Praga Parish (Spanish: Parroquia de Praga) because it is found on Praga 11 Street. The church is known for its German neogothic architecture and was recognized as a temple by the Secretariat of the Interior in 1931.

References

Cuauhtémoc, Mexico City
Gothic Revival church buildings in Mexico
Roman Catholic churches in Mexico City
Paseo de la Reforma